West Tofts is a deserted village located in civil parish of Lynford in the English county of Norfolk. 

The village became deserted when it was taken over by the British Army during the Second World War as part of the Stanford Battle Area, an infantry training area that is still in use today. The village and most of the parish are within a prohibited area and access is not allowed without special permission from the Army.

A remarkable 500,000 year old stone hand axe was found here in 1911 which has a  Cretaceous bivalve mollusc, Spondylus spinosus fossil shell incorporated into its construction. It is now in the Museum of Archaeology and Anthropology, University of Cambridge.

References

 Rootsweb.com (1998–2006). Ghost Towns/Deserted Villages of Great Britain. Retrieved February 17, 2006.

Former populated places in Norfolk
Villages in Norfolk
Ghost towns in England
Breckland District

Forcibly depopulated communities in the United Kingdom during World War II